This is a list of foreign footballers who have been played in the Iran from 1920 to 2000. The following players have been born outside Iran and have not been capped for the Iranian national football team at any level.
Players in bold have capped for their national teams.
see also List of foreign footballers in the Azadegan League
see also List of foreign Footballers in the Iranian Premier League

Azerbaijan
Ilham Kanbarov - F.C. Zob Ahan - 1997-1998
Rafat Kuliev - Esteghlal F.C. - 2000-2001

Armenia
Harutyun Abrahamyan - F.C. Keshavarz Tehran - 1996-1997
Sevada Arzumanyan - F.C. Ararat Tehran - 1995-1996
Vahan Arzumanyan - F.C. Keshavarz Tehran - 1996-1997
Hrachik Avetisyan - Bargh Shiraz F.C. - 1997-1998
Garnik Hovhannisyan - Tractor Sazi F.C. - 2000-2001
Nevik Huvukhuyan - Shamoushak Noshahr F.C. - 1996-1997
Sergei Hayerbabamyan - Shamoushak Noshahr F.C. - 1996-1997
Nevrou Khachaturyan - Teraktor Sazi F.C. - 2000-2001
Abraham Khashmanyan - Teraktor Sazi F.C. - 2000-2001
Aravik Markosyan - Teraktor Sazi F.C. - 2000-2001
Aradus Matusyan - Bargh Shiraz F.C. - 1997-1998
Ara Nigoyan - F.C. Ararat Tehran - 1995-1996, F.C. Zob Ahan - 1996-1998
Anushavan Pahlevanyan - Shamoushak Noshahr F.C. - 1996-1997
Armenak Petrosyan - Sepahan F.C. - 1996-2003
Odik Partisyan - Teraktor Sazi F.C. - 2000-2001
Slavik Sevekazyan - F.C. Zob Ahan - 1997-1998
Levon Stepanyan - F.C. Ararat Tehran - 1995-1996, Sepahan F.C. - 1996-2001
Aramis Tonoyan - F.C. Keshavarz Tehran - 1996-1997, Sepahan F.C. 1997-1998

England
Alan Whittle - Persepolis F.C. - 1977-1978

Iraq
Mohannad Mahdi Al-Nadawi - Sanat Naft Abadan F.C. - 1999-2000

New Zealand
William McClure - Persepolis F.C. - 1977

Nigeria
Said Agyen Sayona - Poora F.C., Bank Tejarat F.C. - 1991-1993

Romania
Marian Ginaro - Shahrdari Tabriz F.C. - 1995-1996

Russia
Sergey Ponomarev - F.C. Zob Ahan - 1994-1995

Scotland
John Peacock - Payam Mashhad F.C. - 1990-1991,1994-1995
Steven Moniye - Payam Mashhad F.C. - 1990-1991,1994-1995

References

 
IPL
Association football player non-biographical articles